The second season of The Fine Brothers' web series MyMusic premiered on Tuesday, August 20, 2013. Unlike with the first season, which had its episodes uploaded to the MyMusicShow YouTube channel, the second season was uploaded to the TheFineBros channel.

Plot
Following the burning of the MyMusic building at the conclusion of the first season, Indie has the MyMusic team returning to its roots. Indie also has the MyMusic crew focusing more on social media and the MyMusic blog.

Announcement and production

In May 2013, the Fine Brothers announced the second season of MyMusic, having released an announcement video on the MyMusicShow channel.

The Fine Brothers were cited saying "We had an overwhelming fan response in Season 1 and we definitely couldn’t have made it to a second season without their viewership and participation."

The production of the second season began on May 14, 2013, with filming taking place at YouTube Space LA.

The Fine Brothers have also been releasing several photos, daily, of production. Videos, or "Production Diaries", have also been released on TheFineBros2, weekly.

The second season saw Lee Newton and Paul Butcher join the MyMusic cast. Toby Turner was also announced to reprise his role as Satan. A production diary video was uploaded featuring Lee Newton as Country, confirming reports that she would be joining the cast, as well as featuring Harley Morenstein as Jesus.

The extended trailer for Season 2, posted on TheFineBros YouTube channel on July 30, revealed the season would begin on August 20.

The budget for MyMusic is "nothing close to a TV size budget."

There will be sitcom versions of the arc episodes after all the webisodes air. The Fine Brothers confirmed this in their vlog, Fine Time.

Cast

Main cast
The main cast from the first season were announced to have reprised their roles.
 Adam Busch as Indie
 Jarrett Sleeper as Metal
 Jack Douglass as Intern 2/Flowchart
 Lainey Lipson as Scene
 Mychal Thompson as Hip Hop/Nerdcore
 Tania Gunadi as Techno
 Chris Clowers as Dubstep
 Lee Newton as Country
 Grace Helbig as Idol

Recurring
 Toby Turner as Satan
 Lia Marie Johnson as Rayna
 Lisa Schwartz as Tina
 Paul Butcher as Jeff Pookie

Notable guest appearances
 Freddie Wong as DJ Elephant ("Ghosts!!!")
 Harley Morenstein as Jesus ("Saying Goodbye :(")
 Janet Varney as Nancy Spackman ("I Can't See!!!")
 Joey Graceffa as Vampire Temp ("I Can't See!!!, "Attention & Affection", "Stand Up for Yourself!", "Someone's Quitting!", "Insane Wife!", and "Wedding Plans!")
 Colleen Ballinger as Receptionist ("Wedding Plans!")

Episodes

References

2010s YouTube series seasons